Robert Michael Miller (September 28, 1956 – September 30, 2020) was an American professional ice hockey player who played 404 games in the National Hockey League between 1977 and 1985. He played for the Boston Bruins, Colorado Rockies, Los Angeles Kings. He featured in the 1978 Stanley Cup Finals with the Bruins. Miller also played in the SM-liiga in Finland for Kärpät and the Nationalliga A in Switzerland for HC Sierre.

Early life 
Miller was born in Medford, Massachusetts. He was a high school hockey star for St. John's Preparatory School, Billerica High, a college hockey star for the University of New Hampshire as well as the U.S. national team at the 1976 Winter Olympics before turning professional.

Career 
Miller was a member of the U.S. team at the 1981 Canada Cup and 1977, 1981, 1982, 1985 Ice Hockey World Championship tournaments.

During Miller's rookie season with the Boston Bruins (1977–78), he was one of 11 Bruins to score 20 goals, a record which has not been equaled by any other NHL team. Miller was present for the ceremony in 2018 when the Bruins celebrated the 40th anniversary of the achievement.

Personal life 
Miller is the older brother of Paul Miller. He died on September 30, 2020 in Tampa, Florida.

Career statistics

Regular season and playoffs

International

Awards and honors

References

External links

1956 births
2020 deaths
AHCA Division I men's ice hockey All-Americans
American men's ice hockey centers
Boston Bruins draft picks
Boston Bruins players
Cleveland Crusaders draft picks
Colorado Rockies (NHL) players
Fort Worth Texans players
Ice hockey players from Massachusetts
Ice hockey players at the 1976 Winter Olympics
Los Angeles Kings players
New Hampshire Wildcats men's ice hockey players
Olympic ice hockey players of the United States
Ottawa 67's players
Oulun Kärpät players
People from Billerica, Massachusetts
Sportspeople from Medford, Massachusetts
Rochester Americans players
HC Sierre players
Sportspeople from Middlesex County, Massachusetts
Springfield Indians players